Anshe Sholom B'nai Israel (Hebrew for: "People of Peace" followed by "Children of Israel") is a Modern Orthodox congregation located in the Lakeview neighborhood on the north side of Chicago, Illinois.

History

The Anshe Sholom B'nai Israel Congregation was founded in 1870 as Ohave Sholom (Lovers of Peace) by a group of Lithuanian Jewish families primarily from Marijampolė, Lithuania.  This congregation is considered to be the oldest Orthodox congregation still existing in Chicago.

Anshe Sholom B'nai Israel began its long record of service to Chicago's Jewish population with a fight over a hat.

In the summer of 1870, Duber (Dov Ber) Ginsburg, an immigrant from Marijampolė, appeared for services at the Bais Medrash Hagodol synagogue wearing a straw hat. The leaders of the shul took exception to its frivolity and threw him out. Offended, Ginsburg assembled a minyan from his old-country friends, and founded a competing shul, Ohave Sholom Mariampol, at Polk and Dearborn Streets.

Barely a year later, the Great Chicago Fire drove many homeless Jewish men and women into their neighborhood, and membership grew rapidly. In 1892, the congregation merged with the Anshe Kalvarier shul (whose building had been demolished when 12th Street, now Roosevelt Road, was widened) and adopted the name, "Anshe Sholom Congregation." In 1894, they retained their first Rabbi, Abraham Samuel Braude zt"l, who served until his death in 1907, and the shul took its place in the top rank of Chicago Jewry. It was long known unofficially as "The Mariampoler Shul" and also informally as "The Straw Hat Shul."

In 1910, two great events occurred: the congregation brought Rabbi Saul Silber zt"l to Chicago, and moved west into a new shul building at Polk and Ashland; a magnificent domed building by Chicago architect Alexander Levy. However, the Jewish community was moving farther west into the Lawndale district, and the Ashland neighborhood soon dried up. As a result, they opened a branch on Homan Avenue and during the 1920s, they sold the Ashland Avenue structure to a Greek Orthodox Christian congregation which still functions to this day. They soon built a brand new grand edifice at Independence and Polk. In that era, the West Side was called "Little Jerusalem," and Jewish life enjoyed a golden age of growth, vigor and prosperity. It was also at this time that Rabbi Silber helped to establish the Hebrew Theological College and served without salary as its first President, while continuing his leadership of Anshe Sholom until his death in 1946.

In the late 1930s, a group of members saw the potential of bringing their kind of open, welcoming Orthodoxy to the North Side, where congregations of other kinds had been thriving since 1910. In 1940, they opened a branch called "Lakeview Anshe Sholom Center," in a converted greystone residence at 540 West Melrose Street. As the branch grew, the members hired a young Hebrew teacher, Rabbi Herman Davis zt"l, and quickly elevated him to the position of the congregation's Rabbi in 1945. More than anyone else, it was Rabbi Davis who made the Lakeview experiment a success, and built the shul into a respected center of Orthodox worship, communal life, and education.

Although Rabbi Davis began early on to raise funds for the construction of a permanent synagogue building, he and the congregation decided to put education first, and instead saw to the construction of the school building (the building has since become the property of the Florence Heller JCC), directly east of Anshe Sholom. Only after this was finished was the present shul erected and dedicated, in 1959.

Two more mergers brought the congregation to its present status. In 1960, the last few members of Congregation B'nai Israel gave up on Old Town, ceased operations in the 1300 block of Sedgwick Street, and the shul became "Lakeview Anshe Sholom B'nai Israel." Two years later, the long postwar decline of the Old West Side brought an end to the main Anshe Sholom Congregation on Independence Boulevard, and it too merged, creating the present shul's name.

After Rabbi Davis' death in 1975, the Congregation retained Rabbi Joseph Deitcher zt"l, whose able service consolidated Rabbi Davis' achievements, and proved that Anshe Sholom Bnai Israel Congregation is not the work of any one person, but rather the expression of the faith and devotion of a like-minded community which upholds Orthodox belief and practice, while confidently engaging with the modern world. After Rabbi Deitcher's death in 1994, Rabbi Asher Lopatin was brought in to be the congregation's spiritual leader.

Well-known members
 Seymour (Maishe) Goldberg z"l, son of the Abraham Mayer Goldberg (wife Mamie Simon), z"l who was one of the founders of the Hebrew Theological College on Chicago's West Side. Abraham with his brothers started a business called Chicago Sanitary Rag, that eventually was run by Seymour (Maishe) Goldberg with his other brothers. Maishe Goldberg also ran Biltrite Box Company in later years. Maishe Goldberg was a staunch supporter of Rabbi Herman Davis.
Rahm Emanuel, a former mayor of Chicago and a former aide to President Barack Obama, is a member of the shul.

See also
 History of the Jews in Chicago

References

External links
 Anshe Sholom B'nai Israel Congregation Homepage

Lithuanian-American culture in Chicago
Lithuanian-Jewish culture in the United States
Orthodox Judaism in Chicago
Synagogues in Chicago
Modern Orthodox synagogues in the United States
Religious organizations established in 1870
Religious organizations based in Chicago